Plumstead is a district in London. 

Plumstead may also refer to:

Plumstead District (Metropolis), former local government district
Plumstead, Cape Town, suburb in the Western Cape Province of South Africa
Plumstead, Norfolk, eastern England
Plumstead Township, Bucks County, Pennsylvania, United States
Great Plumstead, Norfolk, England
Little Plumstead, Norfolk, England

See also
Plumsted Township, New Jersey, United States